Tyson Foerster (born January 18, 2002) is a Canadian professional ice hockey player currently playing for the  Philadelphia Flyers of the National Hockey League (NHL). He was drafted 23rd overall by the Flyers in the 2020 NHL Entry Draft.

Early life
Foerster was born on January 18, 2002, in Alliston, Ontario, Canada to parents Glen and Sheri. He was inspired by his older brother Dawson to begin playing ice hockey, leading their father to build a floor hockey rink in their basement.

Playing career
Growing up, Foerster played with the Barrie Minor Midget Colts, recording 20 goals and 41 assists in 34 regular-season games, before being selected in the third round, 55th overall of the 2018 Ontario Hockey League (OHL) Priority Selection Draft.  During his second season, Foerster recorded six points against the Mississauga Steelheads setting of a point streak through 13 straight games which including six consecutive multi-point efforts. National Hockey League (NHL) scouts noted he showed stark improvement in play and goal scoring, setting career-highs in both goals and assists. Foerster described himself as a "shoot first player with a strong playmaking ability."
 
As a result of his play, Foerster rose from the 41st ranking by the NHL Central Scouting Bureau in January to the 21st by April. He was invited to the 2020 CHL Top Prospects Game where he scored two goals and was named Player of the Game for Team White. He was eventually drafted 23rd overall by the Philadelphia Flyers in the 2020 NHL Entry Draft and signed an entry-level contract with the team on October 14, 2020.

With the hiatus of the OHL due to the ongoing pandemic, Foerster attended the Flyers training camp in preparation for the 2020–21 season. On January 13, 2021, he was re-assigned by the Flyers to AHL affiliate, the Lehigh Valley Phantoms training camp, in order to continue his development. In his first game with the Phantoms, on February 6, 2021, Foerster had an awkward collision with a Hershey Bears player that resulted in a broken tibia for Foerster. He is expected to miss 3-4 weeks.

International play

Foerster was named to Team Canada for the 2022 World Junior Ice Hockey Championships, winning gold.

Career statistics

Regular season and playoffs

International

References

External links

2002 births
Living people
Barrie Colts players
Lehigh Valley Phantoms players
National Hockey League first-round draft picks
Philadelphia Flyers draft picks
Philadelphia Flyers players